Vincent Delerm (born 31 August 1976) is a French singer-songwriter, pianist and composer. He is the son of the writer Philippe Delerm and illustrator Martine Delerm.

His first album was released in 2002, the second, Kensington Square, in 2004, the third Les Piqûres d'araignée in 2006, the fourth Quinze Chansons in 2008 . All were released by the Tôt ou tard record label.

Awards and nominations 
Won
2003 Victoires de la Musique – "Album Revelation of the Year" for album Vincent Delerm 
2003: Grand prix Sacem – Francis-Lemarque Award 
2012: Chevalier des Arts et des Lettres

Nominations
2007 Victoires de la musique – "Male artist interpreter", "Best Album of song and variétés" for Les Piqûres d'araignée and "Best music video" for "Sous les avalanches" for director Bruno Sevaistre
2008 Victoires de la musique – "Musical shows, tours and concerts"
2009 Victoires de la musique – "Best Album of song and variétés" for album Quinze Chansons

Discography

Albums

Live albums

Film scores
The Very Private Life of Mister Sim (2015)

DVD 

 Vincent Delerm : Un soir Boulevard Voltaire published 21 October 2003.

Bibliography
 Songbook Vincent Delerm – 11 titres piano chant, ed. Lili Louise Musique (2003)

Honours
 2003: Victoires de la musique (category "best album").
 2003: Prix Francis Lemarque from Sacem

References

External links
 Official website
  (in French)

1976 births
Living people
People from Évreux
University of Rouen Normandy alumni
French music arrangers
21st-century French dramatists and playwrights
Chevaliers of the Ordre des Arts et des Lettres
French singer-songwriters
21st-century French singers
21st-century French male singers
French male singer-songwriters